François Lapointe (born August 23, 1961 in Montreal, Quebec) is a retired male racewalker from Canada. He set his personal best in the men's 20 km race walk event (1:23:50) in 1987.

Personal bests
20 km: 1:23:50 hrs – 1987
50 km: 3:48:15 hrs –  Seoul, 30 September 1988

Achievements

References

External links
 
 
 
 
 
 

1961 births
Living people
Canadian male racewalkers
Athletes (track and field) at the 1982 Commonwealth Games
Athletes (track and field) at the 1986 Commonwealth Games
Athletes (track and field) at the 1990 Commonwealth Games
Athletes (track and field) at the 1983 Pan American Games
Athletes (track and field) at the 1984 Summer Olympics
Athletes (track and field) at the 1988 Summer Olympics
Olympic track and field athletes of Canada
World Athletics Championships athletes for Canada
Athletes from Montreal
Competitors at the 1986 Goodwill Games
Commonwealth Games competitors for Canada
Pan American Games track and field athletes for Canada